Jarlsberg is a mild cheese made from cow's milk, with large, regular eyes, originating from Jarlsberg, Norway. It is produced in Norway, as well as in Ireland and the US state of Ohio, licensed from Norwegian dairy producers. It is classified as a Swiss-type cheese.

Description
Jarlsberg cheese has a yellow wax rind (outer layer) and a semi-firm yellow interior. It is a mild, buttery cheese. The flavour has been described as "clean and rich, with a slightly sweet and nutty flavour". It is an all-purpose cheese, used for both cooking and eating as a snack. It has a characteristic smooth, shiny-yellow body, and a creamy, supple texture. It is aged a minimum of three months and is distinguished by medium to large holes. Some variations are aged a minimum of 9, 12 or 15 months. The characteristic holes or "eyes" are the result of the action of the bacteria Propionibacterium freudenreichii which naturally occurs in milk and is added back into the cheese during production according to a closely guarded secret formula.

History
The history of this cheese can be traced back to the middle 1850s. The cheese shares similarities with Emmental, introduced to Vestfold by Swiss cheese makers during the 1830s. The cheese was first noted in the annual county report of Jarlsberg and Larviks Amt in 1855. After several years of popularity marked by a large volume of production Jarlsberg disappeared from the market.

Modern Jarlsberg cheese was developed in 1956 by Ole Martin Ystgaard of the Dairy Institute at the Agricultural University of Norway. Ystgaard's interest was sparked by the thesis of a dairy sciences student, Per Sakshaug, on the cheese historically made in Vestfold. It was named for a Norwegian nobleman, Count Wedel Jarlsberg, who owned land near Oslo in an area where an earlier version of the cheese was produced in the early 1800s, or for the eponymous county. The recipe was developed from formulae originating with Swiss cheesemakers who moved to Norway at that time.

Production and distribution

"Jarlsberg" is a trademark first registered by Tine SA in 1972, and the exact nature and formula for the process of making Jarlsberg cheese is a trade secret.  The largest producer of Jarlsberg cheese is Tine SA. Tine is the largest Norwegian dairy product cooperative. Jarlsberg cheese accounts for 80% of Tine's total exports. Tine's United States subsidiary, Norseland, has sold 150 million  wheels of Jarlsberg cheese in the U.S. .

Jarlsberg cheese was introduced in the United States in 1964. It is also produced in Ireland by Dairygold.

Annual sales of Jarlsberg cheese in the United Kingdom are £6.9m . Jarlsberg cheese is also popular in Australia. 
Jarlsberg is used as the topping of the Grandiosa, the best-selling frozen pizza in Norway.

See also
Emmental cheese
Leerdammer
 List of cheeses
Maasdam cheese
Norvegia

References

External links
Jarlsberg.com site of brand owner.

Cow's-milk cheeses
Norwegian cheeses
Cheese with eyes